Joshua Ian Ron Cooke (born 4 February 1997) is an English footballer who plays for Southern League Premier Central side Stratford Town, where he plays as a forward.

Playing career
Josh Cooke became a scholar at Swindon Town in the summer of 2013. On 25 April 2015, the centre-forward made his professional football debut as a second-half substitute in the League One game against Preston North End.

In March 2015, Cooke joined Conference South side Staines Town on a one-month loan deal. On 10 March 2015, Cooke made his Staines Town debut in their 2–1 away defeat against Bishop's Stortford, replacing Elliott Buchanan in the 73rd minute. A month later, Cooke scored his first and only goal for Staines in their 2–1 victory over Weston-super-Mare. On 10 August 2015, Cooke joined recently relegated National League side Cheltenham Town on a one-month loan. Throughout Cooke's loan spell at the club, he failed to register a single start, making six substitute appearances before returning to Swindon at the end of the month. Following a frustrating loan spell at Cheltenham, Cooke joined National League North side Gloucester City on a one-month loan deal in October 2015. On 3 October 2015, Cooke made his Gloucester City debut in their 1–0 home defeat against Harrogate Town, featuring for 72 minutes before being replaced by Joe Parker. A few weeks later, Cooke scored his first league goal for the club in their 1–0 victory over Corby Town, netting the winner in the 66th minute.

On 11 May 2016, it was announced that Cooke would leave Swindon upon the expiry of his current deal.

Following his release from Swindon, Cooke joined National League North side AFC Telford United in August 2016. On 13 September 2016, Cooke made his first and only appearance for Telford in their 3–0 away defeat against his former club; Gloucester City.

Preceding short spells at Continental Star, Alvechurch and Sutton Coldfield Town, Cooke joined Northern Premier League Premier Division side Stourbridge in March 2017.

On 7 August 2018, it was confirmed that Cooke had joined Stratford Town from Stourbridge.

Career statistics

References

External links

1997 births
Living people
English footballers
Association football forwards
Swindon Town F.C. players
Staines Town F.C. players
Cheltenham Town F.C. players
Gloucester City A.F.C. players
AFC Telford United players
Continental Star F.C. players
Alvechurch F.C. players
Sutton Coldfield Town F.C. players
Stourbridge F.C. players
Stratford Town F.C. players
English Football League players